Headland Peak is a peak rising to  on the north side of Geikie Glacier, at the head of Cumberland West Bay, South Georgia. It was named by the UK Antarctic Place-Names Committee for Robert K. Headland, a British Antarctic Survey biological assistant at Grytviken, 1977–80 and 1981–82. He was curator of the Scott Polar Research Institute from 1987.

References

Mountains and hills of South Georgia